Medical Care is a peer-reviewed public health journal that covers the field of health care. The editors-in-chief are Catarina Kiefe and Jeroan J. Allison (University of Massachusetts Medical School). It was established in 1963 and is published by Lippincott Williams & Wilkins. It is the official journal of the Medical Care Section of the American Public Health Association.

Abstracting and indexing 
The journal is abstracted and indexed in:

According to the Journal Citation Reports, the journal has a 2016 impact factor of 3.081, ranking it 15th out of 89 journals in the category "Health Care Sciences and Services".

References

External links 
 
24x7 Home Care Services

English-language journals
Healthcare journals
Monthly journals
Publications established in 1963
Lippincott Williams & Wilkins academic journals